Wild Wild Country is a Netflix documentary series about the controversial Indian guru Bhagwan Shree Rajneesh (Osho), his one-time personal assistant Ma Anand Sheela, and their community of followers in the Rajneeshpuram community located in Wasco County, Oregon, US. It was released on Netflix on March 16, 2018, after premiering at the Sundance Film Festival. The title of the series is drawn from the Bill Callahan song "Drover", which features prominently in the final episode, and it also echoes the comments of Jane Stork ("Ma Shanti B") about first seeing the ranch, shown at the beginning of episode 2: "it was just so wild, so rugged, but vast—really wild country".

Episodes

Season 1 (2018)

Reception

Critical reception

The review aggregator website Rotten Tomatoes surveyed 46 critical responses and judged 98% of them to be positive, with an average rating of 8.1 out of 10. The website's critical consensus reads, "Wild Wild Country succeeds as an intriguing examination of a forgotten piece of American history that must be seen to be believed." Metacritic, which uses a weighted average, assigned a score of 79 out of 100, based on 8 critics, indicating generally favorable reviews.

Sam Wollaston of The Guardian praised Wild Wild Country, giving it a 5 out of 5, stating that "It doesn’t matter how well you know the Rajneeshpuram story – you won’t have seen or heard it told as thoroughly as this".
Nick Allen of RogerEbert.com wrote "by handling this story so intelligently and by opening its heart to a very complicated idea of good and evil, Wild Wild Country has a profound, mesmerizing power itself". Robert Lloyd of Los Angeles Times asserts that "The greater point of the series is its storytelling and wonderful variety of human self-representation, a useful reminder that no two people have the same story to tell. Every speaker is respectfully presented and allowed to speak their piece, and every one is well spoken; rancher or Rajneeshee, government lawyer or commune attorney, each can seem reasonable in turn".

Criticism
An article published in The New Republic criticized Wild Wild Country for leaving out critical information regarding the activities of the Rajneesh followers, particularly regarding sexual assault of women and children as well as possible intent to unleash an AIDS epidemic. In the same article, journalist Win McCormack wrote that "Where the filmmakers have fallen down on the job is in the area of interpretation. They have not addressed squarely some of the more important issues raised by their film, and have left others out completely. The latter category includes a few of the cult’s most odious practices, as well as the true extent of the threat it posed not only to its immediate neighbors in Oregon, but to the entire world." 

Jane Stork, one of the main sources for this documentary, reported in her autobiography Breaking the Spell: My Life as a Rajneeshee and the Long Journey Back to Freedom (2009) that her own children were sexually abused during her time in Rajneeshpuram. This was not included in the documentary.

Osho International Foundation's reaction
The Osho International Foundation, which co-administers Rajneesh's estate and operates the Osho International Meditation Resort in Pune, India, responded to the docuseries on their website Osho Times, saying that "Unfortunately, the docuseries fails to explore key aspects and so does not give a clear account of the real story behind the story", and arguing that the events in Oregon were part of "a U.S. government conspiracy, from the White House on down, aimed at thwarting Osho’s vision of a community based on conscious living."

Accolades

Soundtrack
The show's score album was released on September 21, 2018, via Western Vinyl Records. The soundtrack was composed by Brocker Way. Apart from the score, numerous pre-released songs were also used throughout the series.

Track listing

Related films 
In January 2019, Priyanka Chopra announced that she will be starring as Ma Anand Sheela in an Amazon Studios feature film adaptation of Wild Wild Country. Titled Sheela, the drama film was written by Nick Yarborough and will be directed by Barry Levinson.

In November 2019, Netflix announced a documentary titled Searching for Sheela, which follows Osho's former top aide on her first journey home to India in more than 30 years. The documentary aims to give insight into Sheela's involvement and later prosecution for the 1984 Rajneeshee bioterror attack in Oregon. The documentary premiered on Netflix on April 22, 2021.

References

External links 
 

Netflix original documentary television series
Rajneesh movement
2018 American television series debuts
2018 American television series endings
English-language Netflix original programming
2010s American documentary television series
Television series about cults
Television series by Duplass Brothers Productions
Biological weapons in popular culture